The Western Province Championships and officially known as Western Province Tennis Association Championships was a men's and women's international tennis tournament established in 1892 and was originally played on outdoor grass courts, then switched to hard courts later. It was staged at the Glenhaven Tennis Club, Cape Town, Western Cape Province, South Africa until 1981.

History
The Western Province Championships  were established in 1892 and was orgnaised by the Western Province Tennis Association . The championships formed part of the Sugar Circuit (f. 1962) of tournaments held during the 1960s to 1980s. In 1980 the tournament was discontinued after the withdraw of sponsorship by South African Sugar Association.

Venues
The championships were staged at the Glenhaven Tennis Club, Cape Town, Western Cape Province, South Africa

References

Grass court tennis tournaments
Hard court tennis tournaments
Defunct tennis tournaments in South Africa